Leutnant Hans Weiss was a World War I flying ace credited with 16 aerial victories.

Early life and service
Born on 19 April 1892, Weiss was a native of Hof, which was situated on the Austrian/German border. He began school in Bayreuth in 1912, studying mechanical engineering. After several attempts to volunteer for service at the beginning of World War I, he was accepted by the pioneers at Ingolstadt. He trained in Darmstadt in 1916; one of his schoolmates from high school, Richard Wenzl, trained with him there and would also become an ace.

Weiss began his aerial service as an observer gunner in artillery cooperation units FA(A) 282, FA(A) 28, and FA(A) 68 during June 1916. At that time, he was a corporal.  During a reconnaissance flight, he was wounded in the foot by anti-aircraft fire though flying at nearly 9,000 feet. Upon recovery, he was awarded the Iron Cross Second Class. On a later mission, on 26 May 1917, he bombed an enemy supply train, breaking it in half; he then continued the attack despite ground fire from machine guns and infantry. For this feat, he won the Iron Cross First Class and was promoted to sergeant.

Service as a fighter pilot
Then, in August 1917, he was sent to Jastashule in Valenciennes. By the following month, he was already flying a fighter for Royal Prussian Jagdstaffel 41; he scored his first victory on the 17th. Weiss was then commissioned a leutnant in October 1917. He then went on a streak as a balloon buster, downing four observation balloons in a row. Weiss followed that with four triumphs over enemy aircraft, the last of which, his tenth win, occurred on 13 March 1918. He was transferred to Royal Prussian Jasta 10 which was part of Manfred von Richthofen's "Flying Circus", Jagdgeschwader 1. He scored a single victory there, on 28 March 1918, before being transferred to  another Flying Circus unit, Royal Prussian Jasta 11, as a Flight Leader. He scored his first win in his new unit on 2 April 1918. Six days later, he was selected to temporarily command Jasta 11, and did so until his death in action on 2 May 1918.

On that day, Weiss was flying his Fokker Triplane; although Richthofen's Jagdgruppe used scarlet as their identifying color, Weiss's plane was largely or entirely "Weiss" (white). Weiss died of a bullet through the head from the guns of No. 209 Squadron's Lt. Merrill Samuel Taylor's Sopwith Camel while attacking another Camel from Taylor's unit.

Sources of information

References

 Above the Lines: The Aces and Fighter Units of the German Air Service, Naval Air Service and Flanders Marine Corps, 1914–1918. Norman Franks, Frank W. Bailey, Russell Guest. Grub Street, 1993. , .
 Fokker Dr I Aces of World War I. Norman Franks, Greg VanWyngarden. Osprey Publishing, 2001. , .

German World War I flying aces
1892 births
1918 deaths
People from Hof, Bavaria
People from the Kingdom of Bavaria
Military personnel from Bavaria
Luftstreitkräfte personnel
German military personnel killed in World War I
Aviators killed by being shot down
Recipients of the Iron Cross (1914), 1st class